Malcolm Stewart (born 19 November 1997) is a Saint Vincent and the Grenadines footballer who plays as a winger or forward for TC Sports Club.

Career

In 2018, Stewart signed for Barbadian second division side Blackspurs after playing for Cunupia FC in the Trinidadian lower leagues.

Before the second half of 2019/20, he signed for Maldivian club TC Sports Club.

He is the brother of Saint Vincent and the Grenadines international Cornelius Stewart.

References

External links
 
 
 Malcolm Stewart at playmakerstats.com

Saint Vincent and the Grenadines footballers
Saint Vincent and the Grenadines expatriate footballers
Saint Vincent and the Grenadines international footballers
Living people
Expatriate footballers in Trinidad and Tobago
Expatriate footballers in Barbados
1997 births
Association football forwards
Expatriate footballers in the Maldives
T.C. Sports Club players